Ian Arber is a British composer for film and television. He is based in London, England. In 2019, he composed the music for BBC One's thriller series The Capture alongside Blur's Dave Rowntree. The Capture was the most-watched new BBC series of 2019 with over 20 million streams. Ian also scored BBC Two's comedy series Quacks, Usain Bolt's theatrical-release documentary I Am Bolt, Mo Farah's documentary No Easy Mile, and John Hurt's final film My Name Is Lenny. Ian also was assistant to composer Joe Kraemer on his score for Mission: Impossible – Rogue Nation.

Arber co-composed the score for Mo Farah: No Easy Mile with Blur's Dave Rowntree and collaborated with hip-hop legend Nas on the opening titles of I Am Bolt.

Credits

References

External links 
 
 Official Website
 Twitter
 Agency

Living people
British composers
Year of birth missing (living people)
Alumni of the University of Kent